Ronald Klaas Otto Kers (born 7 July 1969) is a Dutch businessman, and the former group chief executive (CEO) of Müller (company), based in Fischach, Bavaria. Müller has around 21,000 employees, and a €5 billion turnover. After working for several private equity companies in 2017, he joined the 2 Sisters Food Group in June 2018 as CEO, succeeding founder and majority shareholder, Ranjit Singh Boparan. 2SFG has a turnover of £3.4 billion, 21,000 employees and has businesses in poultry, biscuits, ready meals, desserts, and frozen products.

Early life
He went to school in Naaldwijk and ‘s Gravenzande in the Netherlands. After obtaining a degree in Industrial Engineering from the Netherlands, he graduated with an MBA from Schulich School of Business in Toronto, Canada.

Career

P&G
He started with P&G in 1996. He worked in several brand management and commercial roles in Canada, Belgium and Ireland.

Nestlé
He joined Nestlé in 2002 as head of its Global Chilled Dairy Division (Switzerland). He moved to France in 2004, where he set up the joint venture between Nestle Chilled Dairy Europe and Lactalis Produit Frais.

In 2010, he became CEO for Nestle in Austria and Slovenia.

Müller
He became CEO of Müller UK in 2012, later CEO of the worldwide company in 2015, which was announced in July 2014. Müller UK is the biggest manufacturer of yoghurt in the UK. In June, 2015, Kers had brokered a deal which would give Müller control of about one-half of the milk produced in the United Kingdom.

2 Sisters Food Group
In May 2018, Kers was appointed the CEO role of 2 Sisters Food Group. It was announced in February 2023 that he would step down from the role in summer 2023 to take on the CEO role at Valeo Foods.

Personal life
He lives in Cheshire, and has three children.

References

External links
 Müller Group

1969 births
Dutch chief executives in the food industry
Nestlé people
People from Naaldwijk
York University alumni
Living people